Mephistopheles and Margaretta is a 19th-century wooden "double sculpture" of two characters from Johann Wolfgang von Goethe's 1808 play Faust. The obverse depicts the demon Mephistopheles, and the reverse depicts a woman, Margaretta (Margaret, or Gretchen). A mirror placed behind the sculpture allows both sides to be seen simultaneously.

Background 

The sculpture was acquired in France by the Indian nobleman Mir Turab Ali Khan, Salar Jung I, in 1876, and now resides in the Salar Jung Museum in Hyderabad, India. The museum is one of the most visited in the country, and claims one million visitors annually.

The statue reflects the themes of good and evil in Faust. In the play, Faust is frustrated with his life and attempts suicide. He calls for Satan's help, and the demon Mephistopheles, an agent of Satan, responds. Faust is told that Mephistopheles will serve him as long as he lives, but after his death, Faust would forfeit his soul and become enslaved forever. He agrees, making a deal with the Devil, and as one of his requests for magic, Mephistopheles seduces a young woman named Gretchen (Margaretta) for Faust. She is impregnated by Faust and gives birth to his bastard son. Gretchen realizes the evil in the situation and drowns the child, and is held in jail on the charge of murder. Gretchen is hanged but is allowed to go to heaven; Faust is also saved by God because of Gretchen's pleadings.

Sculpture 

The 19th-century sculpture was created by an unknown French sculptor, carved into a block of sycamore wood. The obverse is a depiction of a confident and arrogant Mephistopheles, wearing a hood and boots, and with a smirk on his long face. The reverse is of Gretchen with her head bowed, appearing as a simple girl with downcast eyes.

The statue is carved from one single block of wood and is exhibited with a mirror placed behind it, allowing viewers to observe both sides at the same time. The dichotomy of good and evil is emphasized by the innocence of the female figure, a demure woman holding a prayer book in her hand, contrasting with the depiction of evil exemplified by Mephistopheles.

See also 

 Mephistopheles in the arts and popular culture
 Devil in the arts and popular culture

References

External links 

Video of Mephistopheles and Margaretta Sculpture

19th-century sculptures
Fictional tricksters
Sculptures based on literature
Statues in India
Statues of fictional characters
Theatre characters
Works based on Goethe's Faust
Collections of the Salar Jung Museum